Jeffrey James Snowden (born 15 September 1973) is a former English cricketer.  Snowden was a right-handed batsman & wicketkeeper with a top score of over 200 in club cricket. He was born at Dartford, Kent.

Snowden represented the Kent Cricket Board in a single List A match against the Hampshire Cricket Board in the 2001 Cheltenham & Gloucester Trophy.  In a match ruined by rain, Snowden was not required to bat as the Kent Cricket Board were unable to play their innings.

References

External links
Jeffrey Snowden at Cricinfo
Jeffrey Snowden at CricketArchive

1973 births
Living people
Sportspeople from Dartford
English cricketers
Kent Cricket Board cricketers
Wicket-keepers